Correlophus is a genus of lizards in the family Diplodactylidae endemic to New Caledonia. It includes three species:
Correlophus belepensis Bauer et al., 2012
Correlophus ciliatus Guichenot, 1866 (formerly included in Rhacodactylus)
Correlophus sarasinorum Roux, 1913 (formerly included in Rhacodactylus)

References

 
Geckos of New Caledonia
Lizard genera
Taxa named by Alphonse Guichenot